Radanfah Abu Bakr (born 12 February 1987 in Port of Spain) is a Trinidadian professional footballer who plays as a defender.

Career

Club
Abu Bakr went to Queen's Royal College in Trinidad and began his career in Trinidad and Tobago side Caledonia AIA, before signing for Swansea City on 30 August 2009, in a short-term loan deal until 1 January 2010. He has been signed to help relieve the injury crisis at the club. He previously had two trial spells at the club, in 2007 and in 2008, but was unable to sign for the Swans after they were denied a work permit. Bakr started his career at a relatively late age which he has put down to him deciding to put his head down and study, he took a degree in business management in Kingston University in London.

In August 2009, a work permit was arranged for the UK, and Radanfah signed a three-month contract with Swansea on 1 September 2009. After this deal expired he was not offered terms to extend his stay and so returned to Trinidad to sign for Joe Public. On 21 July 2011, he was signed by Belgium club Olympic Charleroi after a successful trial. He left Olympic Charleroi and returned to Caledonia AIA during the 2012 season.  Abu Bakr helped Caledonia AIA win the 2012 CFU Club Championship on 21 June 2012.  He scored his side's goal in a 1–1 draw after extra time against W Connection, with Caledonia AIA winning 4–2 on penalty kicks.

In February 2013 Abu Bakr moved to Kazakhstan Premier League side Vostok.  He played 28 league games for Vostok before moving to Lithuanian A Lyga side Kruoja a year later.

On 2 February 2015, he signed a contract with Danish club HB Køge.

In July 2016, Abu Bakr signed with Estonian top division club JK Sillamäe Kalev.

On 25 February 2017, he joined Lithuanian A Lyga side Sūduva Marijampolė.

On September 6, 2019 Abu Bakr penned deal with I-League side and is currently playing for Churchill Brothers S.C.

International career
Abu Bakr made his debut for the Trinidad and Tobago national team on 30 July 2008, coming on as a substitute in a friendly against Haiti.  Another substitute appearance followed two weeks later in a friendly against El Salvador.

He would have to wait until June 2009 for his next international; making his first start and competitive appearance in a World Cup qualifier against Mexico, losing 2–1.  Abu Bakr scored his first international goal a month later in a 3–2 friendly win against Saint Kitts and Nevis.  He went on to play in a further four of Trinidad and Tobago's qualifiers for the 2010 World Cup, but lost his place in the side after that.

Abu Bakr returned to the international side in June 2013 as part of Trinidad and Tobago's build up to the 2013 CONCACAF Gold Cup, playing in friendlies away against Romania and Estonia.  He was selected for his nation's squad for the tournament, and helped them reach the quarter-finals where they lost narrowly to Mexico.

Career statistics

Club

International

Statistics accurate as of match played 8 January 2017

International goals
''Updated to games played 8 June 2014

Personal life
His brother Ayinde is former manager of Caledonia AIA and over the years trained his brother there.

References

External links
 
 
 

1987 births
Living people
Trinidad and Tobago footballers
Trinidad and Tobago international footballers
Association football defenders
TT Pro League players
Kazakhstan Premier League players
Morvant Caledonia United players
Joe Public F.C. players
Swansea City A.F.C. players
FC Vostok players
A Lyga players
HB Køge players
JK Sillamäe Kalev players
Meistriliiga players
FK Sūduva Marijampolė players
Trinidad and Tobago expatriate footballers
Trinidad and Tobago Muslims
Expatriate footballers in Belgium
Trinidad and Tobago expatriate sportspeople in Belgium
Expatriate footballers in Lithuania
Trinidad and Tobago expatriate sportspeople in Lithuania
Expatriate footballers in Kazakhstan
Trinidad and Tobago expatriate sportspeople in Kazakhstan
Expatriate men's footballers in Denmark
Trinidad and Tobago expatriate sportspeople in Denmark
Sportspeople from Port of Spain
2013 CONCACAF Gold Cup players
2014 Caribbean Cup players
2015 CONCACAF Gold Cup players
Alumni of Queen's Royal College, Trinidad
Expatriate footballers in Estonia
Trinidad and Tobago expatriate sportspeople in Estonia